Ácsteszér (Ács-Teszér) is a village in Komárom-Esztergom county, Hungary.

Etymology 
The name of the village referred to the profession of the villagers. Hungarian ács and Slavic tesar with the same meaning - a carpenter.

People 
 Mihály Táncsics, born here

References

External links 
 Street map (Hungarian)

Populated places in Komárom-Esztergom County
Hungarian German communities